"Everybody Loves Me But You" is a song written by Ronnie Self and performed by Brenda Lee.  The song reached #2 on the adult contemporary chart and #6 on the Billboard Hot 100 in 1962.

The song was ranked #73 on Billboard magazine's Top Hot 100 songs of 1962.

In media
Lee's version was featured on season 5 Cold Case episode, "Boy Crazy".

References

1962 songs
1962 singles
Brenda Lee songs
Decca Records singles
Songs written by Ronnie Self